Locke is a 2013 psychological drama film written and directed by Steven Knight. The film stars Tom Hardy in the title role, the only character seen on screen, as he carries on a number of speakerphone conversations with characters voiced by Olivia Colman, Ruth Wilson, Andrew Scott, Ben Daniels, Tom Holland and Bill Milner.

The film premiered at the 70th Venice Film Festival on 2 September 2013. The film had a limited release in the United Kingdom beginning on 18 April 2014, and grossed $5 million worldwide. Locke received critical acclaim, particularly for Hardy's performance, which won him the Los Angeles Film Critics Association Award for Best Actor.

Plot
The evening before he must supervise a large concrete pour in Birmingham (the largest non-nuclear facility, non-military concrete pour in European history), construction foreman Ivan Locke learns that Bethan, a colleague from a job in Croydon with whom he had a one-night stand seven months before (which resulted in her becoming pregnant), has gone into premature labour. Despite his job responsibilities and although his wife and sons are eagerly awaiting his arrival home to watch a football match, Locke decides to drive to London to be with Bethan during childbirth. Locke never forgave his father for abandoning him as a child, and he is determined not to make the same mistake, even though he has no relationship with, nor any particular feelings for, Bethan.

Over the course of the one and a half-hour drive from Birmingham to London, Locke holds a total of 36 phone calls with: his boss Gareth; his junior Donal; Katrina, wife of 15 years, to confess his infidelity; his sons, Eddie and Sean, who call him separately with updates on the match and (eventually) the worrisome breakdown of their mother; St Mary's maternity unit medical personnel, Sister Margaret then Halil Gullu, who are working with Bethan through some troubling complications; the council head, Cassidy, and local police authority, PC Davids, required for the road closures needed to allow the 225+ concrete trucks to properly access the site; and with Bethan to reassure her during her labour. During these calls, he is fired from his job, banned from his house by his wife, and asked by his older son to please return home. He coaches his assistant Donal through preparing the pour despite some major setbacks, and has imaginary conversations with his dead father, whom he envisions (unseen onscreen) as a passenger in the car; he berates his father for abandoning Locke's family, and vows he will not repeat that mistake. When he is close to the hospital, Bethan calls to share the cooing of the baby, having had a successful birth.

Cast

Starring
 Tom Hardy as Ivan Locke

Voices

 Olivia Colman as Bethan Maguire
 Ruth Wilson as Katrina Locke
 Andrew Scott as Donal
 Ben Daniels as Gareth
 Tom Holland as Eddie Locke
 Bill Milner as Sean Locke
 Danny Webb as Cassidy
 Alice Lowe as Sister Margaret
 Silas Carson as Halil Gullu
 Lee Ross as PC Davids
 Kirsty Dillon as Gareth's wife

Production
Almost the entire film takes place within a BMW X5, which was pulled down the M6 motorway on a low flatbed trailer for most of the shoot. Shooting took place over six nights, with the crew only taking breaks to change the three cameras' memory cards. Ivan Locke is the only character to appear onscreen; the others are heard on the vehicle's speakerphone, with their parts also recorded in real time (Locke's vehicle and road noise included) as they called from a conference room that served as the multiple "locations" of the various characters.

Release
Locke was shown out of competition at the 70th Venice International Film Festival as well as the Spotlight program in the 2014 Sundance Film Festival.

It was released on 18 April 2014 in the United Kingdom, where it earned $1,434,082. On 25 April 2014 it opened in the United States and earned $1,375,769. The film was released on Blu-ray and DVD on 12 August 2014.

Reception

Rotten Tomatoes reports that 91% of 217 surveyed critics gave the film a positive review; the average rating is 7.7/10. The critical consensus states: "A one-man show set in a confined location, Locke demands a powerful performance – and gets it from a never-more-compelling Tom Hardy." The film has a score of 81 out of 100 on Metacritic based on 37 critics, indicating "universal acclaim".

Olly Richards of Empire awarded the film four out of five stars and said: "There are films to see on huge screens, but this is one that almost cries out for a small cinema, surrounded by total blackness. It's a daring experiment brilliantly executed, with Tom Hardy giving one of the best performances of his career".

In his book How to Watch a Movie (2015), David Thomson singles out this film and says: "No film I've seen in recent years is more eloquent on where we are now, and on how alone we feel. There is little left but to watch and listen."

For his performance, Hardy won the Best Actor Award from the Los Angeles Film Critics Association.

References

External links
 
 
 

2013 films
2010s drama road movies
A24 (company) films
Adultery in films
American drama road movies
British drama road movies
British pregnancy films
2010s English-language films
Films about mobile phones
Films set in Birmingham, West Midlands
Films set in London
IM Global films
American pregnancy films
Films with screenplays by Steven Knight
Films directed by Steven Knight
2013 drama films
2010s pregnancy films
2010s American films
2010s British films